Barb Haley is an American politician and member of the Minnesota House of Representatives. A member of the Republican Party of Minnesota, she represents District 21A in southeastern Minnesota.

Early life, education, and career
Haley was born and raised in Red Wing, Minnesota, where she graduated from Red Wing Central High School in 1982. She attended the University of St. Thomas, graduating with a Bachelor of Arts in international studies.

Haley was national director of sales force effectiveness for AT&T. She was a member on the Fairview Red Wing Health Services Board from 2007 to 2012 and was executive director of SteppsUp. She is executive director of Red Wing WORKS and a member of the boards of the Red Wing Family YMCA and WomenCents.

Minnesota House of Representatives
Haley was elected to the Minnesota House of Representatives in 2016 and reelected in 2018 and 2020. She became Minority Whip in 2021.

Personal life
Haley and her husband, Tim, have two children. They reside in Red Wing, Minnesota.

References

External links

 Official House of Representatives website
 Official campaign website

1960s births
Living people
Republican Party members of the Minnesota House of Representatives
21st-century American politicians
21st-century American women politicians
Women state legislators in Minnesota